Thomas Edison is a bronze sculpture depicting the American inventor and businessman of the same name by Alan Cottrill, installed in the United States Capitol's National Statuary Hall, in Washington, D.C., as part of the National Statuary Hall Collection. The statue was gifted by the U.S. state of Ohio in 2016, and replaced one depicting William Allen, which had been donated in 1887.

See also
 2016 in art
 Thomas Edison in popular culture

References

External links
 

Bronze sculptures in Washington, D.C.
Cultural depictions of Thomas Edison
Monuments and memorials in Washington, D.C.
Edison, Thomas
Sculptures of men in Washington, D.C.